Jacksons Corner is a thoroughfare in the English town of Reading, Berkshire. It is a prominent landmark site and is on the corner of Market Place and Kings Road.

History
For much of its history, the site of Jacksons Corner was home to the Reading branch of the Jacksons department store chain.

Popular culture
Jacksons Corner is featured briefly in the PBS Documentary "Secrets of Selfridges". The small interview covers a few of the strict guidelines for staff members in the early 1900s, as well as a look at the previously unseen upper floor, which houses the former staff quarters.

References

Landmarks in the United Kingdom
Tourist attractions in Reading, Berkshire